Charles Lee "Monk" Williams (February 15, 1945 – March 18, 2003) was an American football flanker who played one season with the Cincinnati Bengals of the American Football League. He was drafted by the Bengals in the sixth round of the 1968 NFL Draft. He played college football at the University of Arkansas at Pine Bluff and attended Joseph S. Clark High School in New Orleans, Louisiana.

References

External links
Just Sports Stats

2003 deaths
Players of American football from Shreveport, Louisiana
American football wide receivers
Arkansas–Pine Bluff Golden Lions football players
Cincinnati Bengals players
American Football League players
1945 births